Tan Lee Meng (born 7 July 1948) is a professor in the National University of Singapore Faculty of Law. He was first appointed as a Judicial Commissioner on 2 February 1997, and then appointed Judge in August 1997, serving until he reached the mandatory retirement age of 65 on 7 July 2013. He also completed two consecutive three-year terms of service as a Senior Judge of the Supreme Court of Singapore.

Early life and education
Tan attended the University of Singapore (now the National University of Singapore), and graduated from its Faculty of Law with a Bachelor of Laws (LL.B.) with first class honours in 1972. He subsequently obtained a Master of Laws (LL.M.) from the University of London in 1974, and was admitted to the Bar as an advocate and solicitor in 1976.

Career as academic
Tan joined the University of Singapore's Faculty of Law in 1972, eventually rising to the position of Dean in 1987 and Deputy Vice-Chancellor of the National University of Singapore in 1992. From 1980 to 1997, he also served as Master of Raffles Hall, staying on campus with students of the National University of Singapore hostel.

Tan is the author of the books The Law in Singapore on Carriage of Goods by Sea (1986) and Insurance Law in Singapore (1988), and various law journal articles.

Selected works

Articles
.
.
.
.
.

Books
. Later editions:
.
.

References

External links
Official website of the Supreme Court of Singapore

Living people
Alumni of the University of London
National University of Singapore alumni
Singaporean Christians
Singaporean people of Chinese descent
1948 births
Judges of the Supreme Court of Singapore